Wittmackia silvana is a species of flowering plant in the family Bromeliaceae, endemic to Brazil (the state of Bahia). It was first described in 2003 as Ronnbergia silvana.

References

Bromelioideae
Flora of Brazil
Plants described in 2003